A card shark is a person who uses skill and/or deception to win card games.

Card Shark(s) can also refer to:
Card Shark, a 2022 video game
Card Sharks, a television game show
Card Sharks (video game), a 1987 computer game
Card Sharks (anthology), a 1993 book in the Wild Cards science fiction series